Acer pilosum is an Asian species of maple. It has been found only in north-central China (Gansu, Inner Mongolia, Ningxia, Shaanxi, Shanxi).

Acer pilosum is a small deciduous tree up to 5 meters tall. Leaves are non-compound, up to 8 cm wide and 12 cm across, toothless, deeply cut into 3 lobes.

References

pilosum
Plants described in 1880
Flora of China